Andorrans who are notable include:

Officials
 Roser Bastida Areny (born 1955), member of the General Council of Andorra
Lídia Armengol i Vila, (19481991), Deputy Secretary General of the Presidency
 Jaume Bartumeu Cassany (born 1954), lawyer, Head of Government candidate for the Social Democratic Party (Andorra), head of the parliamentary opposition
 Joan Benlloch i Vivó (18641926), bishop of Urgell and Catalan co-prince, wrote Andorra's national anthem
 Carles Blasi Vidal (born 1964), member of the General Council of Andorra
 Josep Maria Farré Naudi, politician 
 Bernadeta Gaspà Bringueret (born 1965), member of the General Council of Andorra
 Guillem d'Areny-Plandolit (18221876), leader of the 1866 New Reform, member of the General Council of Andorra
 Ricard de Haro Jiménez, politician 
 Julian Vila Coma, Ambassador to the United Nations
 Maria Pilar Riba Font, sat on the General Council, 20052011
 Antoni Martí (born 1963), Head of Government of Andorra since 2011
 Marc Forné Molné, Head of Government of Andorra, 19942005
 Albert Pintat (born 1943), Head of Government of Andorra, 20052011
 Julià Reig Ribó (19111996), general councillor for the Valles de Andorra, 19481949; general syndic, 19601978
 Jordi Jordana Rossell (born 1960), politician
 Joan Albert Farré Santuré (born 1968), politician 
 Boris de Skossyreff (18961989), Russian émigré, self-proclaimed "Boris I, King of Andorra" in 1934, before the Catalan co-prince intervened to restore order
 Pere Joan Tomas Sogero, businessman and diplomat  
 Juli Minoves Triquell (born 1969), minister, diplomat, writer
 Esther Rabasa Grau, diplomat

Arts and music
 Ana Arce (born 1964), photographer and former skip of Andorra's curling team
 Anonymous, band
 Lluís Claret (born 1951), cellist
 Persefone, progressive metal band
 Marta Roure (born 1981), singer

Athletes
 Alex Antor (born 1979), alpine skier who represented Andorra at the 2006 Winter Olympics
 Ana Arce (born 1964), photographer and former skip of Andorra's curling team
 Marc Bernaus (born 1977), footballer
 Juli Fernández (born 1974), footballer
 Melissandre Fuentes (born 1988), figure skater
 Hocine Haciane, swimmer at the 2004 Summer Olympics
 Stéphanie Jiménez, high altitude athlete
 Koldo (born 1970), footballer, born in Vitoria-Gasteiz
 Ildefons Lima (born 1978), footballer
 Antoni Sivera (born 1978), footballer
 Oscar Sonejee (born 1976), footballer
 Laure Soulie (born 1987), biathlete

Writers
 Josep Carles Laínez (born 1970), writer and journalist; lives in Encamp; writes for the newspaper El Periòdic d'Andorra
 Juli Minoves Triquell (born 1969), minister, diplomat, writer

See also

List of Catalans